The Lady of Blossholme is a 1909  historical novel by H. Rider Haggard. It is set during the time of Henry VIII, and features the Pilgrimage of Grace.

References

External links
Complete book at Project Gutenberg

Novels by H. Rider Haggard
1909 British novels
English historical novels